"A Dios le Pido" (I beg to God) is the lead single from the Spanish studio album Un Día Normal by the Latin music singer and songwriter Juanes, released in 2002 in Spain and Latin America. In 2006, the song was re-released in some countries in Europe, right after the success of "La Camisa Negra", which charted in almost every European country in the top five. It reached number 1 in twelve countries on three different continents. "A Dios le Pido" spent 47 consecutive weeks on the "Hot Latin Tracks" Billboard reaching number 2 (kept out from the number one spot by Chayanne's Y Tú Te Vas and Jennifer Peña's El Dolor de Tu Presencia).

This track won the Latin Grammy Award for Best Rock Song at the Latin Grammy Awards of 2002, the second year in a row for the singer.

The song is an anthem asking God to bless and protect the singer's family, future children, and close friends. It quickly became a hymn for peace through all of Latin America, particularly because of the line "a Dios le pido que mi pueblo no derrame tanta sangre y se levante mi gente," – ("I ask God: may my country not shed so much blood and may my people rise up").

Track listings
Digital download (Surco/1 September 2003)
"A Dios le Pido" – 3:27
"A Dios le Pido" [Acoustic Version] – 3:30
"Fijate bien" [Original Version] – 4:50
"Nada" [Acoustic Version] – 3:55

Mexican CD single (Universal/2002)
"A Dios le Pido" [Original Version] – 3:26
"A Dios le Pido" [Acoustic Version] – 3:28

EU CD single (Surco/8 September 2003)
"A Dios le Pido" [Original Version] – 3:26
"A Dios le Pido" [Acoustic Version] – 3:28

EU CD single (Universal/7 April 2006)
"A Dios le Pido" [Album Version] – 3:25
"A Dios le Pido" [Full Phatt Remix] – 3:40

French CD single (Universal/3 April 2006)
"A Dios le Pido" – 3:25
"La Camisa Negra" – 3:34

EU maxi single (Universal/7 April 2006)
"A Dios le Pido" [Album Version] – 3:25
"A Dios le Pido" [Full Phatt Remix] – 3:40
"Un Día Normal" [Album Version] – 3:53

Charts

Weekly charts

Year-end charts

Certifications

References

Juanes songs
2002 singles
2003 singles
2006 singles
Spanish-language songs
Christian songs
Songs written by Juanes
Number-one singles in Spain
Song recordings produced by Gustavo Santaolalla
2002 songs
Universal Music Latino singles
Latin Grammy Award for Best Rock Song